Veldhuyzen van Zanten or Veldhuijzen van Zanten is a Dutch family name. People with the name include:

 Jacob Veldhuyzen van Zanten, Dutch airline pilot at KLM who was involved in the 1977 Tenerife airport disaster
 Marlies Veldhuijzen van Zanten, Dutch politician
 Ida Veldhuyzen van Zanten, Dutch WW2 pilot

See also
 Zanten, a surname